Steven K. Roberts (born September 25, 1952) is an American journalist, writer, cyclist, archivist, and explorer who rode his computerized bicycle, a modified Avatar 2000, pulling a trailer with solar panels and a laptop, and gaining press coverage, across the United States of America from 1983 to 1991. His book, Computing Across America, documents his journey.

The first year and a half of his bike tour covered over 10,000 miles. He wrote articles in his tent and filed the pieces via pay phone submitting them to publications like Time and Newsweek.  The bike, also known as the BEHEMOTH, had an estimated $300,000 of equipment on it, mostly donated, including satellite email retrieval, HAM radio, and a paging system that would page him if an urgent email arrived while he was away from the bike.

After he was featured on the front page of The Wall Street Journal, media coverage accelerated and included a full one hour appearance on The Phil Donahue Show.

As press attention mounted, he shifted his efforts and built a computerized trimaran. He worked on various iterations of the trimaran for years.

As of 2017, he had turned his efforts in to digitizing records, and was living aboard a 50-foot power boat equipped with a 3-D printer, weather station, virtual reality system, electronic piano, 10 ham radios, and more, around 50,000 pounds worth, in Friday Harbor, WA.

Books
Industrial Design With Microcomputers 1982
Creative Design With Microcomputers 1984
Computing Across America: The Bicycle Odyssey of a High-Tech Nomad Steve describes the wild results of his drastic break with suburban life on his 10,000-mile journey across the United States of America on his computerized bicycle. 1988
From Behemoth to Microship Steve's journey from computerized recumbent bicycles, Winnebiko and BEHEMOTH to system design and early adventures with the Microships that are amphibian pedal/solar/sail networked folding micro-trimarans. 2000.

References

External links
Nomadic Research Labs
Holloway.com – Part III: A Brief History of Nomads 2022
Astro.com/astro-databank
Computer History Museum

1952 births
Living people
20th-century American male writers
20th-century American journalists
Cyclists from Pennsylvania
American male journalists
Journalists from Pennsylvania
American technology journalists